Houlton High School is a public high school in Houlton, Maine, United States. It is part of regional school unit (RSU) 29.

Notable alumni
 Dora Pinkham - In 1922 she became the first woman elected to the Maine Legislature.

References

External links
 Houlton Middle/High School

Public high schools in Maine
Houlton, Maine
Schools in Aroostook County, Maine